Oraison is a commune in the Alpes-de-Haute-Provence department in southeastern France.

Geography
The river Asse forms all of the commune's southern border, then flows into the Durance, which forms all of its western border.

Population

See also
Communes of the Alpes-de-Haute-Provence department

References

Communes of Alpes-de-Haute-Provence
Alpes-de-Haute-Provence communes articles needing translation from French Wikipedia